Aussie is Australian slang for Australian, both the adjective and the noun, and less commonly, Australia.

Pronunciation
In Australia, New Zealand, South Africa, the United Kingdom, and Ireland, the word is pronounced , hence the alternative form Ozzie; however, in the United States, it is most often pronounced  .

Ethnic usage
Aussie is used defensively by some Australians as a term of identification for people and as a nickname for the cultural group of Anglo-Celtic descent.

Chants
 Aussie Aussie Aussie, Oi Oi Oi
 C'mon Aussie C'mon, an Australian cricket anthem

See also
 
 
 Down Under
 Kiwi (people)
 British people
 Yankee
 Canuck

References

External links
AussiEmoji - express the daily Aussie lifestyle

Regional nicknames
Australian slang
New Zealand slang